A special election was held in  on September 23, 1811 and November 4, 1811 to fill a vacancy left by the resignation of Joseph Bradley Varnum (DR) upon being elected to the Senate on June 29, 1811

Election results
Two elections were required, due to a majority not being achieved on the first election

Richardson took his seat January 22, 1812

See also
List of special elections to the United States House of Representatives

References

United States House of Representatives 1811 04
Massachusetts 1811 04
Massachusetts 1811 04
1811 04
Massachusetts 04
United States House of Representatives 04